The Eclipse class was a class of seven 6-gun wooden screw sloops built for the Royal Navy between 1867 and 1870.  They were re-armed and re-classified as 12-gun corvettes in 1876. Two further vessels were proposed but never ordered.

Design

The hull was of wooden construction, but with iron cross-beams, and a ram bow was fitted.

Propulsion

Propulsion was provided by a two-cylinder horizontal steam engine driving a single screw.  Spartan, Sirius and Tenedos had compound steam engines, and the remainder of the class had single-expansion steam engines.

Sail plan

All the ships of the class were built with a ship rig, but this was replaced with a barque rig.

Armament

The Eclipse class was designed with two 7-inch (6½-ton) muzzle-loading rifled guns mounted in traversing slides and four 64-pounder muzzle-loading rifled guns. They were re-classified as corvettes in 1876, carrying a homogenous armament of twelve 64-pounder muzzle-loading rifled guns.

Ships

Notes

Bibliography

External links

Sloop classes
 
 Eclipse